Cyril Turner was an English footballer who played in the Football League for West Ham United.

References

English footballers
Association football defenders
English Football League players
West Ham United F.C. players